This is a list of local government areas (LGAs) in Victoria, sorted by region. 

Also referred to as municipalities, the 79 Victorian LGAs are classified as cities (34), shires (38), rural cities (6) and boroughs (1). In general, an urban or suburban LGA is called a city and is governed by a city council, while a rural LGA covering a larger rural area is usually called a shire and is governed by a shire council. Local councils have the same administrative functions and similar political structures, regardless of their classification.

Greater Melbourne

Regional Victoria

Barwon South West

Grampians

Gippsland

Hume

Loddon Mallee

See also 

Government of Australia
Australian Local Government Association
Municipal Association of Victoria

References

External links 

Victorian Local Governance Association

Local government areas